Iregszemcse (means Ireg-Szemcse) is a village in Tolna County, Hungary.

History 

Two villages Felső-Ireg and Szemcséd was jointed in 1938.

Districts 

 Új Élet
 Rákóczi
 Újbarázda

Nearby municipalities 
 Csehi-Puszta
 Okrádpuszta
 Új-Ireg
 Nagy-Szokoly
 Medgyespuszta
 Fornádpuszta
 Tamási

Sights 
 Viczay-Kornfeld Castle (1820)
 Kornfeld Castle:
 Kálvária-kápolna: 15th-century gothic temple

External links 
 Street map

References 

Populated places in Tolna County
1263 establishments in Europe
1938 establishments in Hungary